The Jauaperi River is a river of Amazonas state in northwestern Brazil, a tributary of the Rio Negro.

The lower section of the river forms part of the border between Amazonas and Roraima.
Most of the river basin is in the  Waimiri Atroari Indigenous Territory.

See also
List of rivers of Amazonas

References

Sources

Rivers of Amazonas (Brazilian state)
Tributaries of the Rio Negro (Amazon)